Erf or ERF may refer to:

Industry 
 Enerplus, a North American energy producer whose stock is listed as ERF under the TSX and NYSE
 ERF (truck manufacturer), a former British truck manufacturer

Mathematics 
 Error function, erf
 Exponential response formula

Science and technology 
 ERF (gene), coding for ETS domain-containing transcription factor
 Electrorheological fluid
 Eukaryotic release factors
 Event-related field

Other uses 
 Erf (law), in real estate law
 Erf (river), in Germany
 Estuarine Research Federation, an American environmental organization
 Erfurt-Weimar Airport, in Germany (IATA code)
 European Racquetball Federation
 European Refugee Fund
 Extreme Reaction Force, in United States military prisons
 Reformed Church of France, a Christian denomination in France